The Murray River Open was a new addition to the ATP Tour in 2021.

Top seeds Nikola Mektić and Mate Pavić won the title, defeating Jérémy Chardy and Fabrice Martin in the final, 7–6(7–2), 6–3.

Seeds

Draw

Finals

Top half

Bottom half

References

 Main Draw

Murray River Open - Doubles